Justice Sweeney may refer to:

A. William Sweeney (1920–2003), associate justice of the Ohio Supreme Court
Francis E. Sweeney (1934–2011), associate justice of the Ohio Supreme Court
 James G. Sweeney (1877–1917), associate justice of the Supreme Court of Nevada
John W. Sweeney (c. 1869–1964), associate justice of the Rhode Island Supreme Court
Nigel Sweeney (born 1954), justice of the High Court of justice of England and Wales

See also
Judge Sweeney (disambiguation)